Death Jr. II: Root of Evil is a 2006 action-adventure game developed by Backbone Entertainment and the sequel to the PlayStation Portable video game Death Jr. The game has various differences from the first, including having a second playable character, Pandora.

Gameplay

Plot

Development and release

Reception 

The game was given mixed, but generally positive reviews. Detroit Free Press criticized the game's uninteresting combat and poor camera controls.

References

External links

2006 video games
Hack and slash games
Konami games
Multiplayer and single-player video games
PlayStation Portable games
Video games about death
Video games developed in Canada
Video games featuring female protagonists
Video game sequels
Wii games
Action-adventure games
Fictional personifications of death